A Good Thief is a British television crime drama film, written by and starring Kay Mellor, that first broadcast on ITV on 22 July 2002. The film, directed by Douglas Mackinnon, stars Mellor as Rita Pickering, a working class mother who witnesses a brutal drugs killing. After she testifies in court, she is threatened by a number of gang members, and fearing for her life, goes on the run and is forced to turn to shoplifting to survive.

Liz Smith stars as Rita's elderly neighbour Lizzie, while Angel Coulby takes on the role of Rita's daughter Leah. The film was Mellor's first acting role in several years after initially giving up acting and turning her hand to scriptwriting. The film drew 6.06 million viewers on its debut broadcast. Notably, the film has never been released on VHS or DVD.

Casting
The film was shelved for several years after the initial casting fell through. Mellor stated; "A Good Thief was the only script that ended up in my trunk unproduced. I wrote it for Pippa Cross and Granada Television and when the original casting fell through it was something I put to one side while I concentrated on other projects." Mellor stated she originally wrote the role of Rita for Julie Walters, although she was unable to commit to the role due to other work commitments.

Reception
The Northern Echo reviewed the film following its debut broadcast, commenting: "This was one of those TV movies that couldn't decide whether to be funny or serious. Mixing killings and beatings up with almost slapstick comic capers is difficult. And A Good Thief lurched uncertainly from comedy to drama, leaving the poor viewer uncertain if to laugh or cry. Or just switch off."

Cast

 Kay Mellor as Rita Pickering
 Liz Smith as Lizzie
 Angel Coulby as Leah Pickering
 Martin Reeve as Ray Delaney
 Vincent Davies as Micky Pickering
 Tony Melody as Alfie
 Denise Black as Janet Lavery
 Richard Heap as Jez
 Adrian Kennedy as Rob
 Burn Gorman as DC Fairchild
 Anthony Bessick as Gus Dickenson
 Susan Twist as Mrs. Sutherland
 Terence Harvey as Ivor Thackery
 Paul Gibbons as Anton
 Naomi Radcliffe as Joanne
 Basienka Blake as Roanna
 Karen Meagher as Mrs. Shipley
 Annie Fitzmaurice as Sarah
 Clive Bonelle	as Steve
 Jeff Merchant	as Mr. Stanley
 Gordon Alcock as Norman

References

External links

2002 television films
2002 films
British television films
British crime films
ITV television dramas
Television series by ITV Studios
Television shows produced by Granada Television
Films shot in Yorkshire
2000s English-language films
2000s British films